Isla Huivulai ("long neck" in the Mayo language) is a private island located five kilometers off the coast of the Mexican state of Sonora in the Gulf of California.

The island is part of the municipio of Benito Juárez and is located 45 kilometers south of Ciudad Obregón. Huivulai island is 14 kilometers long and 0.5 kilometers wide. One of the main attractions of the island is its fine sand beach, artesian well, and high sandy dunes.

In this island, the successful Mexican western movie Todo por nada was filmed in 1968.

Fauna
There is a fresh water artesian well that is 97 meters deep creating an oasis of date-producing palm trees where birds such as fulvous whistling duck, grey pelicans and American white pelicans live as well as grey herons, cranes and albatross. Other species of birds seen in the island are turnstones, spoonbills, skimmers, waders, and other shorebirds, gulls, terns, frigatebirds, and boobies.

Along the island's fine sandy beach and the almost flat slopped ocean, in its large Tobari bay, tourists fish for mullets, sea bass, and two species of the genus Epinephelus.

External links

Huivulai birdwatching
Tourism site  of Ciudad Obregón
Beaches near Ciudad Obregón  of the municipio of Cajeme
Municipio Benito Juárez 

Islands of Sonora
Islands of the Gulf of California
Uninhabited islands of Mexico